Ernst Wilhelm Büchner (18 March 1850 – 25 April 1924) was the German industrial chemist after whom the Büchner flask and Büchner funnel are named. The patent for his two inventions was published in 1888.

Life 
His father was the pharmacist, chemist, industrialist and politician Wilhelm Büchner. Ernst was also the nephew of the playwright Georg Büchner and the philosopher, physiologist and physician Ludwig Büchner. Büchner studied chemistry in Tübingen. In his dissertation, he addressed the issue of separation of Chlorbromanilins. In 1882, Ernst Büchner took over the management of the family business. In 1890 he divided the Pfungstadt operating in the "United ultramarine factories". The creation of such an agreement was in response to the emerging "petrochemistry" whose further growth finally resulted in the extinction of the company in 1893. Büchner was first married with his cousin Mathilda Büchner (6 January 1850 – 1 April 1908) and had two children with her, the chemist Carl Büchner (28 June 1877 – 9 July 1929) and the painter Friedrich (Fritz) Büchner (1 April 1880 – 22 June 1965). After their divorce in 1885, he married Marie Ludovike Karoline von Ferber (6 August 1850 – 20 April 1925). From this marriage came Anton Büchner (28 July 1887 – 27 August 1985), the first biographer of the Büchner siblings.

References

 

1850 births
1924 deaths
19th-century German chemists
20th-century German chemists